The Federation of Construction and Woodworkers (FECOMA) was a trade union representing workers in the building and woodworking industries in Spain.

The union was founded in 1984, when the National Federation of Construction merged with the National Federation of Wood.  Like both its predecessors, it affiliated to the Workers' Commissions.  By 1994, it had 44,581 members.  In 2014, it merged with the Federation of Private Services, to form the Federation of Construction and Services.

References

Building and construction trade unions
Trade unions established in 1984
Trade unions disestablished in 2014
Trade unions in Spain